Nebraska Highway 95 is a highway in northeastern Nebraska.  It has a western terminus at an intersection with Nebraska Highway 11 west of Chambers.  Its eastern terminus is at U.S. Highway 281 to the east of Chambers.

Route description
Nebraska Highway 95 begins at an intersection with NE 11 west of Chambers.  It heads in an eastward direction through farmland, passing through Chambers.  It continues to the east before terminating at US 281.

Major intersections

References

External links

Nebraska Roads: NE 81-100

095
Transportation in Holt County, Nebraska